A voting system is consistent if, whenever the electorate is divided (arbitrarily) into several parts and elections in those parts garner the same result, then an election of the entire electorate also garners that result. Smith calls this property separability and Woodall calls it convexity.

It has been proven a ranked voting system is "consistent if and only if it is a scoring function", i.e. a positional voting system. Borda count is an example of this.

The failure of the consistency criterion can be seen as an example of Simpson's paradox.

As shown below under Kemeny-Young, passing or failing the consistency criterion can depend on whether the election selects a single winner or a full ranking of the candidates (sometimes referred to as ranking consistency); in fact, the specific examples below rely on finding single winner inconsistency by choosing two different rankings with the same overall winner, which means they do not apply to ranking consistency.

Examples

Copeland 

This example shows that Copeland's method violates the consistency criterion. Assume five candidates A, B, C, D and E with 27 voters with the following preferences:

Now, the set of all voters is divided into two groups at the bold line. The voters over the line are the first group of voters; the others are the second group of voters.

First group of voters 
In the following the Copeland winner for the first group of voters is determined.

The results would be tabulated as follows:

 [X] indicates voters who preferred the candidate listed in the column caption to the candidate listed in the row caption
 [Y] indicates voters who preferred the candidate listed in the row caption to the candidate listed in the column caption

Result: With the votes of the first group of voters, A can defeat three of the four opponents, whereas no other candidate wins against more than two opponents. Thus, A is elected Copeland winner by the first group of voters.

Second group of voters 
Now, the Copeland winner for the second group of voters is determined.

The results would be tabulated as follows:

Result: Taking only the votes of the second group in account, again, A can defeat three of the four opponents, whereas no other candidate wins against more than two opponents.  Thus, A is elected Copeland winner by the second group of voters.

All voters 
Finally, the Copeland winner of the complete set of voters is determined.

The results would be tabulated as follows:

Result: C is the Condorcet winner, thus Copeland chooses C as winner.

Conclusion 
A is the Copeland winner within the first group of voters and also within the second group of voters. However, both groups combined elect C as the Copeland winner. Thus, Copeland fails the consistency criterion.

Instant-runoff voting 

This example shows that Instant-runoff voting violates the consistency criterion. Assume three candidates A, B and C and 23 voters with the following preferences:

Now, the set of all voters is divided into two groups at the bold line. The voters over the line are the first group of voters; the others are the second group of voters.

First group of voters 
In the following the instant-runoff winner for the first group of voters is determined.

B has only 2 votes and is eliminated first. Its votes are transferred to A. Now, A has 6 votes and wins against C with 4 votes.

Result: A wins against C, after B has been eliminated.

Second group of voters 
Now, the instant-runoff winner for the second group of voters is determined.

C has the fewest votes, a count of 3, and is eliminated. A benefits from that, gathering all the votes from C. Now, with 7 votes A wins against B with 6 votes.

Result: A wins against B, after C has been eliminated.

All voters 
Finally, the instant runoff winner of the complete set of voters is determined.

C has the fewest first preferences and so is eliminated first, its votes are split: 4 are transferred to B and 3 to A. Thus, B wins with 12 votes against 11 votes of A.

Result: B wins against A, after C is eliminated.

Conclusion 
A is the instant-runoff winner within the first group of voters and also within the second group of voters. However, both groups combined elect B as the instant-runoff winner. Thus, instant-runoff voting fails the consistency criterion.

Kemeny-Young method 

This example shows that the Kemeny–Young method violates the consistency criterion. Assume three candidates A, B and C and 38 voters with the following preferences:

Now, the set of all voters is divided into two groups at the bold line. The voters over the line are the first group of voters; the others are the second group of voters.

First group of voters 
In the following the Kemeny-Young winner for the first group of voters is determined.

The Kemeny–Young method arranges the pairwise comparison counts in the following tally table:

The ranking scores of all possible rankings are:

Result: The ranking A > B > C has the highest ranking score. Thus, A wins ahead of B and C.

Second group of voters 
Now, the Kemeny-Young winner for the second group of voters is determined.

The Kemeny–Young method arranges the pairwise comparison counts in the following tally table:

The ranking scores of all possible rankings are:

Result: The ranking A > C > B has the highest ranking score. Hence, A wins ahead of C and B.

All voters 
Finally, the Kemeny-Young winner of the complete set of voters is determined.

The Kemeny–Young method arranges the pairwise comparison counts in the following tally table:

The ranking scores of all possible rankings are:

Result: The ranking B > A > C has the highest ranking score. So, B wins ahead of A and C.

Conclusion 
A is the Kemeny-Young winner within the first group of voters and also within the second group of voters. However, both groups combined elect B as the Kemeny-Young winner. Thus, the Kemeny–Young method fails the consistency criterion.

Ranking consistency 
The Kemeny-Young method satisfies ranking consistency; that is, if the electorate is divided arbitrarily into two parts and separate elections in each part result in the same ranking being selected, an election of the entire electorate also selects that ranking.

Informal proof 
The Kemeny-Young score of a ranking  is computed by summing up the number of pairwise comparisons on each ballot that match the ranking . Thus, the Kemeny-Young score  for an electorate  can be computed by separating the electorate into disjoint subsets  (with ), computing the Kemeny-Young scores for these subsets and adding it up:
.

Now, consider an election with electorate . The premise of the consistency criterion is to divide the electorate arbitrarily into two parts , and in each part the same ranking  is selected. This means, that the Kemeny-Young score for the ranking  in each electorate is bigger than for every other ranking :

Now, it has to be shown, that the Kemeny-Young score of the ranking  in the entire electorate is bigger than the Kemeny-Young score of every other ranking :

Thus, the Kemeny-Young method is consistent with respect to complete rankings.

Majority Judgment 

This example shows that majority judgment violates the consistency criterion. Assume two candidates A and B and 10 voters with the following ratings:

Now, the set of all voters is divided into two groups at the bold line. The voters over the line are the first group of voters; the others are the second group of voters.

First group of voters 
In the following the majority judgment winner for the first group of voters is determined.

The sorted ratings would be as follows:

Result: With the votes of the first group of voters, A has the median rating of "Excellent" and B has the median rating of "Fair". Thus, A is elected majority judgment winner by the first group of voters.

Second group of voters 
Now, the majority judgment winner for the second group of voters is determined.

The sorted ratings would be as follows:

Result: Taking only the votes of the second group in account, A has the median rating of "Fair" and B the median rating of "Poor". Thus, A is elected majority judgment winner by the second group of voters.

All voters 
Finally, the majority judgment winner of the complete set of voters is determined.

The sorted ratings would be as follows:

The median ratings for A and B are both "Fair". Since there is a tie, "Fair" ratings are removed from both, until their medians become different. After removing 20% "Fair" ratings from the votes of each, the sorted ratings are now:

Result: Now, the median rating of A is "Poor" and the median rating of B is "Fair". Thus, B is elected majority judgment winner.

Conclusion 
A is the majority judgment winner within the first group of voters and also within the second group of voters. However, both groups combined elect B as the Majority Judgment winner. Thus, Majority Judgment fails the consistency criterion.

Minimax 

This example shows that the minimax method violates the consistency criterion. Assume four candidates A, B, C and D with 43 voters with the following preferences:

Since all preferences are strict rankings (no equals are present), all three minimax methods (winning votes, margins and pairwise opposite) elect the same winners.

Now, the set of all voters is divided into two groups at the bold line. The voters over the line are the first group of voters; the others are the second group of voters.

First group of voters 
In the following the minimax winner for the first group of voters is determined.

The results would be tabulated as follows:

 [X] indicates voters who preferred the candidate listed in the column caption to the candidate listed in the row caption
 [Y] indicates voters who preferred the candidate listed in the row caption to the candidate listed in the column caption

Result: The candidates B, C and D form a cycle with clear defeats. A benefits from that since it loses relatively closely against all three and therefore A's biggest defeat is the closest of all candidates. Thus, A is elected minimax winner by the first group of voters.

Second group of voters 
Now, the minimax winner for the second group of voters is determined.

The results would be tabulated as follows:

Result: Taking only the votes of the second group in account, again, B, C and D form a cycle with clear defeats and A benefits from that because of its relatively close losses against all three and therefore A's biggest defeat is the closest of all candidates. Thus, A is elected minimax winner by the second group of voters.

All voters 
Finally, the minimax winner of the complete set of voters is determined.

The results would be tabulated as follows:

Result: Again, B, C and D form a cycle. But now, their mutual defeats are very close. Therefore, the defeats A suffers from all three are relatively clear. With a small advantage over B and D, C is elected minimax winner.

Conclusion 
A is the minimax winner within the first group of voters and also within the second group of voters. However, both groups combined elect C as the Minimax winner. Thus, Minimax fails the consistency criterion.

Ranked pairs 

This example shows that the Ranked pairs method violates the consistency criterion. Assume three candidates A, B and C with 39 voters with the following preferences:

Now, the set of all voters is divided into two groups at the bold line. The voters over the line are the first group of voters; the others are the second group of voters.

First group of voters 
In the following the Ranked pairs winner for the first group of voters is determined.

The results would be tabulated as follows:

 [X] indicates voters who preferred the candidate listed in the column caption to the candidate listed in the row caption
 [Y] indicates voters who preferred the candidate listed in the row caption to the candidate listed in the column caption

The sorted list of victories would be:

Result: B > C and A > B are locked in first (and C > A can't be locked in after that), so the full ranking is A > B > C. Thus, A is elected Ranked pairs winner by the first group of voters.

Second group of voters 
Now, the Ranked pairs winner for the second group of voters is determined.

The results would be tabulated as follows:

The sorted list of victories would be:

Result: Taking only the votes of the second group in account, A > C and C > B are locked in first (and B > A can't be locked in after that), so the full ranking is A > C > B. Thus, A is elected Ranked pairs winner by the second group of voters.

All voters 
Finally, the Ranked pairs winner of the complete set of voters is determined.

The results would be tabulated as follows:

The sorted list of victories would be:

Result: Now, all three pairs (A > C, B > C and B > A) can be locked in without a cycle. The full ranking is B > A > C. Thus, Ranked pairs chooses B as winner, which is the Condorcet winner, due to the lack of a cycle.

Conclusion 
A is the Ranked pairs winner within the first group of voters and also within the second group of voters. However, both groups combined elect B as the Ranked pairs winner. Thus, the Ranked pairs method fails the consistency criterion.

Schulze method 

This example shows that the Schulze method violates the consistency criterion. Again, assume three candidates A, B and C with 39 voters with the following preferences:

Now, the set of all voters is divided into two groups at the bold line. The voters over the line are the first group of voters; the others are the second group of voters.

First group of voters 
In the following the Schulze winner for the first group of voters is determined.

The pairwise preferences would be tabulated as follows:

Now, the strongest paths have to be identified, e.g. the path A > B > C is stronger than the direct path A > C (which is nullified, since it is a loss for A).

Result: A > B, A > C and B > C prevail, so the full ranking is A > B > C. Thus, A is elected Schulze winner by the first group of voters.

Second group of voters 
Now, the Schulze winner for the second group of voters is determined.

The pairwise preferences would be tabulated as follows:

Now, the strongest paths have to be identified, e.g. the path A > C > B is stronger than the direct path A > B.

Result: A > B, A > C and C > B prevail, so the full ranking is A > C > B. Thus, A is elected Schulze winner by the second group of voters.

All voters 
Finally, the Schulze winner of the complete set of voters is determined.

The pairwise preferences would be tabulated as follows:

Now, the strongest paths have to be identified:

Result: A > C, B > A and B > C prevail, so the full ranking is B > A > C.  Thus, Schulze chooses B as winner. In fact, B is also Condorcet winner.

Conclusion 
A is the Schulze winner within the first group of voters and also within the second group of voters. However, both groups combined elect B as the Schulze winner. Thus, the Schulze method fails the consistency criterion.

STAR voting

References
John H Smith, "Aggregation of preferences with variable electorate", Econometrica, Vol. 41 (1973), pp. 1027–1041.
D. R. Woodall, "Properties of preferential election rules", Voting matters, Issue 3 (December 1994), pp. 8–15.
H. P. Young, "Social Choice Scoring Functions", SIAM Journal on Applied Mathematics Vol. 28, No. 4 (1975), pp. 824–838.

Electoral system criteria